Taiyuan Railway Station is a railway station on the Tongpu Railway, Shitai Railway and Shitai Passenger Railway. It is located in Taiyuan, Shanxi, China.

History
Construction was started in 1904.
The station opened in 1907.

See also
Taiyuan South railway station

References

External links
Taiyuan Railway Station(Taiyuan Railway Bureau)

Railway stations in Shanxi
Railway stations in China opened in 1907
Stations on the Qingdao–Taiyuan High-Speed Railway